Lipo may refer to:

Science and technology
 Liposuction, a medical procedure
 Lithium polymer battery (Li-pol)
 lipo, a Mac OS X command line utility for the manipulation of Mach-O universal binary object files

Other uses
 Lipo language, a language of the Lisu people
 Li Po or Li Bai (701–762), Chinese poet

See also
 Lipovitan, an energy drink
 Lipotomy, a medical procedure